Ommatolampis is a genus of short-horned grasshoppers in the family Acrididae. There are at least four described species in Ommatolampis, found in South America.

Species
These species belong to the genus Ommatolampis:
 Ommatolampis equatoriana Carbonell & Descamps, 1978
 Ommatolampis pazii Bolívar, 1881
 Ommatolampis perspicillata (Johannson, 1763)
 Ommatolampis quadrimaculata Carbonell & Descamps, 1978

References

External links

 

Acrididae